Falcatula svaricki is a moth of the family Sphingidae. It is known from Ethiopia and Kenya.

References

Smerinthini
Moths described in 2008